Catostomus cahita, cited as the cahita sucker or matalote cahita, is a species of freshwater fish in the family Catostomidae.
It is found only in Mexico.

References

Catostomus
Freshwater fish of Mexico
Taxa named by Darrell J. Siebert
Taxa named by Wendell L. Minckley
Fish described in 1986
Taxonomy articles created by Polbot